The 2018 Spa-Francorchamps FIA Formula 2 round was a pair of motor races held on 25 and 26 August 2018 at the Circuit de Spa-Francorchamps in Stavelot, Belgium as part of the FIA Formula 2 Championship. It was the ninth round of the 2018 FIA Formula 2 Championship and was run in support of the 2018 Belgian Grand Prix.

Classification

Qualifying

Notes
– Antonio Fuoco was handed a 3-place grid penalty for failing to serve a time penalty during his pit stop in the Hungary Sprint Race.

Feature race

Sprint race

Championship standings after the round

Drivers' Championship standings

Teams' Championship standings

References

External links 
 

Spa-Francorchamps
Formula 2
Formula 2